McPherson County Courthouse may refer to:

McPherson County Courthouse (Kansas), McPherson, Kansas
McPherson County Courthouse (South Dakota), Leola, South Dakota